is a train station located in Chikushino, Fukuoka.

Lines 

Nishi-Nippon Railroad
Tenjin Ōmuta Line

Platforms

History
March 1, 1971: Opening of the station

Adjacent stations 

Railway stations in Fukuoka Prefecture
Railway stations in Japan opened in 1971